Richard Hart Brown (June 15, 1941 – June 23, 2005) was a founder of Interoperative Neurophysiological Monitoring and a leading expert on amusement ride and roller coaster safety.

He was a founder of the American Society of Neurophysiologic Monitoring and a charter member of the American Board of Neurophysiologic Monitoring. He was also a member of many ANSI boards relating to materials and amusement ride safety.

References

External links
 Los Angeles Times Obituary
 Find A Grave

1941 births
2005 deaths
American neuroscientists